Lake Caroline is a census-designated place in Caroline County, Virginia, United States. The population as of the 2010 Census was 2,260.

The CDP is bordered by U.S. Route 1 on the east, Cedar Fork Road on the south, and State Route 683 on the north.

References

External links
Lake Caroline Property Owners Association

Census-designated places in Caroline County, Virginia
Census-designated places in Virginia